Boones Mill is a town in Franklin County, Virginia, United States. The population was 239 in 2018, down from 285 at the 2000 census. It is part of the Roanoke Metropolitan Statistical Area.

History

Boones Mill was incorporated in 1927. It was previously known as "Boone Mill" and "Boon Mill". The town is named after Jacob Boon who operated a mill in the town.

The Boones Mill Depot is listed on the National Register of Historic Places. Nearby historic sites include Bowman Farm, Cahas Mountain Rural Historic District, Jubal A. Early House, and Piedmont Mill Historic District.

Geography
Boones Mill is located in northern Franklin County at  (37.115462, -79.953966), along U.S. Route 220 at the southern base of the Blue Ridge Mountains. US 220 leads north  to Roanoke and south  to Rocky Mount, the Franklin County seat.

The town is in the valley of Maggodee Creek, a southeast-flowing tributary of the Blackwater River, part of the Roanoke River watershed.

Demographics

As of the census of 2020, there were 259 people.

There were 131 households, out of which 26.0% had children under the age of 18 living with them, 50.4% were married couples living together, 5.3% had a female householder with no husband present, and 41.2% were non-families. Of all households, 34.4% were made up of individuals, and 10.7% had someone living alone who was 65 years of age or older. The average household size was 2.18 and the average family size was 2.82.

In the town, the population was spread out, with 20.4% under the age of 18, 9.1% from 18 to 24, 33.0% from 25 to 44, 22.5% from 45 to 64, and 15.1% who were 65 years of age or older. The median age was 36 years. For every 100 females there were 91.3 males. For every 100 women age 18 and over, there were 97.4 men.

The median income for a household in the town was $39,688, and the median income for a family was $44,821. Males had a median income of $37,500 versus $23,542 for females. The per capita income for the town was $16,795. About 3.8% of families and 8.2% of the population were below the poverty line, including 10.9% of those under the age of eighteen and 11.6% of those 65 or over.

References

External links
 http://www.townofboonesmill.org/
 https://www.townofboonesmill.org/history

Towns in Franklin County, Virginia
Towns in Virginia